Satipo Province is the largest and easternmost province in the Junín Region, located in the central Amazon rainforest of Peru. Its capital is the town of Satipo.

Geography
The Satipo Province borders the provinces of Huancayo, Concepción, Jauja and Chanchamayo on the west; Pasco Region's Oxapampa Province on the north; Atalaya Province in the Ucayali Region on the northwest; and Cusco Region's La Convención Province on the east and southeast. The Mantaro River marks the province's border with Ayacucho Region's Huanta Province on the south and Huancavelica Region's Tayacaja Province on the southwest.

History
The first inhabitants of present-day Satipo Province were the Asháninkas, Piros, Amueshas, Nomatsiguengas, Simirinches, Amewakas, Cakintis, among others. They left a legacy of petroglyphs which are believed to be from more than 3500 years ago. Ceramics, stone and golden axes, as well as many constructions show that the area was also inhabited by the Incas. Many battles were fought between the Incas and the other natives, whose extensive knowledge of the jungle helped them win.

The first Europeans arrived in the province's territory in 1673, when the Franciscans founded Santa Cruz, their first settlement in the area.

Many Indian uprisings happened during the 18th century.

President Manuel Prado created the Satipo District as part of the Jauja Province on September 18, 1940.

On November 1, 1947, a strong earthquake destroyed the city, causing entire settlements to disappear. Satipo could not be reached by land and remained isolated until 1960.

The district of Satipo was elevated to the provincial status by President Fernando Belaúnde Terry on March 26, 1965.

During the late 1980s, the province was hit hard by terrorism and caused a massive exodus from the province. Many persons were killed by terrorists, including the Mayor of Satipo, Fidel Juarez Torres.

Political divisions
Satipo Province is divided into nine districts, each of which is headed by a mayor (alcalde):

Gallery

See also 
 Asháninka Communal Reserve
 Challwamayu
 Otishi National Park

External links
 El Portal de la Provincia de Satipo

References

1965 establishments in Peru
States and territories established in 1965
Provinces of the Junín Region